Paul M. Lieberman, Ph.D., is an American biomedical researcher and chairperson of the Gene Expression and Regulation Program at the Ellen and Ronald Caplan Cancer Center at The Wistar Institute in Philadelphia. He is also the Hilary Koprowski, M.D., endowed professor, the McNeil professor of Molecular Medicine and Translational Research, and the founding director for the Center for Chemical Biology and Translational Medicine at The Wistar Institute. Lieberman's research focuses on how viruses cause cancer and autoimmune disease, particularly the Epstein–Barr virus.

Education
He earned a BA in chemistry from Cornell University (1983) and a Ph.D. in molecular virology from Johns Hopkins School of Medicine (1989).

Career and research
Lieberman and his laboratory have facilitated the development of the first annotated atlas of the Epstein-Barr virus epigenome. In 2011, Lieberman received a Seeding Drug Discovery Award from Wellcome Trust for $4.7 million to develop a drug against Epstein-Barr virus-related cancers. This was the first project to receive such an award from the United Kingdom-based trust. He also leads a team developing a drug to treat Epstein-Barr virus-related cancers. This project received a United Kingdom-based Wellcome Trust Seeding Drug Discovery.

Lieberman previously served as the president of the International Association for Research on Epstein-Barr Virus and Associated Diseases and is an elected fellow of the American Association for the Advancement of Sciences (AAAS).

Select publications
 
 
 
 
 
 Deng Z, Glousker G, et al., Lieberman PM, Tzfati, Y. Inherited mutations in the helicase RTEL1 cause telomere dysfunction and Hoyeraal-Hreidarsson syndrome.  PNAS  2013.
 Dheekollu J, Chen HS, Kaye KM, Lieberman PM. Timeless-dependent DNA replication-coupled recombination promotes Kaposi's Sarcoma-associated herpesvirus episome maintenance and terminal repeat stability.  Journal of Virology. 2013 Apr 87(7):369.
 Deng Z, Wang Z, Stong N, Plasschaert R, et al. Riethman H, and Lieberman PM. A role for CTCF and cohesion in subtelomere chromatin organization, TERRA transcription, and telomere end protection.  EMBO J. 2012 Nov 31(21):4165.
 Kang H, Cho H, Sung GH, Lieberman PM. CTCF regulates Kaposi's sarcoma-associated herpesvirus latency transcription by nucleosome displacement and RNA polymerase programming. Journal of Virology 2013 Feb 87(3)1789.
 Arvey A, Tempera I, Tsai K, Chen HS, Tikhmyanova N, Klichinsky M, Leslie C, Lieberman PM. An atlas of the Epstein-Barr virus transcriptome and epigenome reveals host-virus regulatory interactions. Cell Host Microbe 2012 Aug 12(2)233.

References

External links
Dr. Lieberman's lab page on The Wistar Institute's website
 

Cancer researchers
Living people
Year of birth missing (living people)
Cornell University alumni
Johns Hopkins School of Medicine alumni
American virologists
American medical researchers